The 1995–96 Courage League National Division Three was the ninth full season of rugby union within the third tier of the English league system, currently known as National League 1. Following relegation last season, Coventry won the division by three points to finish as champions and are promoted back to National Division Two. Richmond, as runner-up, was also promoted and owing to an increase in the number of teams in the above divisions, next season, Rugby and Rotherham were also promoted. There was no relegation because National Division Three will consist of sixteen teams next season.

Structure
The league consists of ten teams, playing each other on a home and away basis to make a total of eighteen matches for each team. There are usually two promotion places and two relegation places, with the champions and runner-up promoted to National League 2 and the last two teams relegated to National Division 4. Owing to a reorganisation of the league system four teams are promoted and none relegated this season.

Participating teams and locations 

Six of the clubs participated in last seasons competition.

League table

Sponsorship
National Division Three is part of the Courage Clubs Championship and is sponsored by Courage Brewery.

See also
 English Rugby Union Leagues
 English rugby union system
 Rugby union in England

References

N3
National League 1 seasons